Padmini Swaminathan is an Indian feminist economist. She is the current Chairperson of the Centre for Livelihoods at the Tata Institute of Social Sciences (TISS), Hyderabad. She has also served as the Director of the Madras Institute of Development Studies (MIDS) and held the Chair for Regional Studies of the Reserve Bank of India at MIDS until her retirement in 2011. Swaminathan studies industrial organization, labour, education and health from a gender perspective.

Published works

See also
 Feminist economics
 Unpaid domestic work

References

Further reading

External links
 

21st-century Indian economists
Indian women economists
Living people
Indian feminists
University of Mumbai alumni
Year of birth missing (living people)